Marko Ramljak (born March 14, 1993) is a Croatian professional basketball player, currently playing for Zadar of the Croatian League.

Early life
Ramljak grew up in Posušje where he drew attention to himself with his plays for the Croatian national basketball youth teams. He also participated at the 2010 Summer Youth Olympics were his team won the silver medal.

Professional career
Ramljak signed his first professional contract with Zadar in September 2010. Ramljak constantly improved his performances and during the 2012–13 season, his second season in Zadar, he had become one of the club's key players.

On August 27, 2016, Ramljak parted ways with Zadar to join Cedevita for the 2016–17 season, where he helped the team to win the Croatian Cup and the Croatian League titles.

On September 6, 2017, Ramljak signed with Bosnian team Zrinjski Mostar. In 36 games played during the 2017–18 season, he averaged 11.4 points, 5.4 rebounds and 2.5 assists per game. Ramljak helped Zrinjski to win the Bosnian League title in 2018.

On April 22, 2019, Ramljak signed with the Israeli team Hapoel Be'er Sheva, but eventually the deal fell through and he returned to play for Zrinjski for the rest of the season. He joined Cibona in 2019 and averaged 8.2 points and 3.4 points per game. Ramljak was released by the team on July 15, 2020.

In August 2020, Ramljak signed with Balkan Botevgrad of the Bulgarian League.

On January 17, 2021, he signed with Twarde Pierniki Toruń of the Polish Basketball League (PLK).

In September, 2021, he joined his home town club Posušje of the Bosnian League. Ramljak averaged 17.2 points and 8.0 rebounds per game. On January 3, 2022, he signed with Spars Sarajevo.

Personal life
His brothers, Tomislav (born 1985) and Ivan (born 1990) are also basketball players and have all played in the Croatia national basketball team youth selections.

References

External links
 Profile at aba-liga.com
 Profile at fiba.com
 Profile at realgm.com

1993 births
Living people
ABA League players
Basketball players at the 2010 Summer Youth Olympics
Croatian men's basketball players
Croatian expatriate basketball people in Bulgaria
Croats of Bosnia and Herzegovina
KK Cedevita players
KK Cibona players
KK Zadar players
OKK Spars players
People from Posušje
Small forwards
Shooting guards